Miguel Gutiérrez Hernández (born 28 September 1963) is a Mexican politician from the National Action Party. From 2000 to 2003 he served as Deputy of the LVIII Legislature of the Mexican Congress representing Guanajuato.

References

1963 births
Living people
People from León, Guanajuato
Politicians from Guanajuato
National Action Party (Mexico) politicians
21st-century Mexican politicians
Deputies of the LVIII Legislature of Mexico
Members of the Chamber of Deputies (Mexico) for Guanajuato